The Ministry of Evkaf was an Ottoman Empire ministry in charge of awqaf (evkaf), administering waqfs (then known in Western languages as "vakouf", from the Turkish name). It was upgraded to a ministry in 1840 after being initially created in the century as the Bureau of Imperial Administration of Evkaf.

References

Evkaf